The Basketball Classic presented by ERACE was a single-elimination, fully-bracketed men's college basketball postseason tournament created in 2022 as a successor to the CollegeInsider.com Postseason Tournament, featuring up to 32 National Collegiate Athletic Association (NCAA) Division I teams not selected to participate in the 2022 NCAA Division I men's basketball tournament, the NIT, or the 2022 College Basketball Invitational.  All games were streamed on ESPN+.  In lieu of a traditional bracket, The Basketball Classic used the old NIT model in which the matchups will be set after each round.  The Basketball Classic was founded by Collegeinsider.com to replace the former CollegeInsider.com Postseason Tournament, which was discontinued after its scheduled 2020 and 2021 tournaments were cancelled because of the COVID-19 pandemic.

Format
The tournament consists of three rounds, single elimination, the games are held on campuses of participating schools. All gate receipts will be collected by The Basketball Classic. Schools can host games in the tournament without the responsibility of an additional financial commitment.

Broadcast
The following is an overview and list of the announcers and television networks to broadcast The Basketball Classic:

Champions

References

External links
 

 
Recurring sporting events established in 2022
College men's basketball competitions in the United States
Postseason college basketball competitions in the United States